Phil S. Baran (born August 10, 1977) is a Professor in the Department of Chemistry at the Scripps Research Institute and Member of the Skaggs Institute for Chemical Biology. Baran has authored over 130 published scientific articles. He has several patents. His work is focused on synthesizing complex organic compounds, the development of new reactions, and the development of new reagents.

Early life and education 
He received his BS in chemistry from New York University in 1997 and his PhD from The Scripps Research Institute in 2001, under the supervision of K.C. Nicolaou. He did his postdoctoral fellowship in the laboratory of Nobel Laureate E. J. Corey at Harvard University.

Awards and honors
 Highly Cited Researcher (2020)
 Emanuel Merck Lectureship, 2017
Mukaiyama Award, 2014
MacArthur Fellowship, 2013
Royal Society of Chemistry Synthetic Organic Chemistry Award, 2013
ACS San Diego Section Distinguished Scientist Award, 2012
ISHC Katritzky Heterocyclic Chemistry Award, 2011
Thieme–IUPAC Prize in Synthetic Organic Chemistry, 2010
ACS Award in Pure Chemistry, 2010
Sackler Prize, 2009
Novartis Lecturer, 2007 – 2008
Hirata Gold Medal, 2007
National Fresenius Award, 2007
Pfizer Award for Creativity in Organic Chemistry, 2006
Beckman Young Investigators Award, 2006
Alfred P. Sloan Foundation Fellow, 2006–2008
BMS Unrestricted "Freedom to Discover" Grant, 2006 – 2010
NSF Career, 2006 – 2010
Eli-Lilly Young Investigator Award, 2005 – 2006
AstraZeneca Excellence in Chemistry Award, 2005
DuPont Young Professor Award, 2005
Roche Excellence in Chemistry Award, 2005
Amgen Young Investigator Award, 2005
Searle Scholar Award, 2005
GlaxoSmithKline Chemistry Scholar Award, 2005–2006
Nobel Laureate Signature Award for Graduate Education in Chemistry, ACS, 2003
National Institutes of Health Post-Doctoral Fellowship Award, Harvard, 2001 – 2003
Hoffmann-La Roche Award for Excellence in Organic Chemistry, 2000
Lesly Starr Shelton Award for Excellence in Chemistry Graduate Studies, 2000
National Science Foundation Pre-Doctoral Fellowship Award, Scripps, 1998–2001

References

External links
 Phil Baran: Molecule Magician, The Scientist Magazine
 The sultan of synthesis, Chemistry World, Royal Society of Chemistry
 Evolution from Academia to Industry – Interview with Professor Phil S. Baran, Oxbridge Biotech Roundtable

21st-century American chemists
Scripps Research faculty
MacArthur Fellows
1977 births
Living people
New York University alumni